Nikolskoye is a rural locality (a village) in Sheybukhtovskoye Rural Settlement, Mezhdurechensky District, Vologda Oblast, Russia. The population was 16 as of 2002.

Geography 
Nikolskoye is located 22 km southwest of Shuyskoye (the district's administrative centre) by road. Tupitsyno is the nearest rural locality.

References 

Rural localities in Mezhdurechensky District, Vologda Oblast